Events from the year 1759 in Canada.

Incumbents
French Monarch: Louis XV
British and Irish Monarch: George II

Governors
Governor General of New France: Pierre François de Rigaud, Marquis de Vaudreuil-Cavagnal
Colonial Governor of Louisiana: Louis Billouart
Governor of Nova Scotia: Charles Lawrence
Commodore-Governor of Newfoundland: Richard Edwards

Events
 Tuesday May  22 - A British fleet approaches Quebec.
 Thursday June 28 - French fire ships, intended to burn the British fleet, at Quebec, are taken ashore by British sailors.
 Thursday July 26 - Carillon (Fort Ticonderoga) is abandoned by the French.
 Saturday July 28 - Another French fireship attack fails against the British.
 Tuesday  July 31 - British forces attempt to take French fortifications at Montmorency and fail bitterly.
 August 8 to August 9 - British guns, on Pointe Lévis, fire the lower town of Quebec.
 Thursday September 13 - James Wolfe lands a force at Fuller's Cove, between 1 and 2 in the morning. They climb to the Plains of Abraham. At 6 a.m., Marquis de Montcalm is informed that the British have accomplished what he deemed impossible; but discredits the report. With 4,500, he fights about an equal number; but his men cannot resist bayonets. Each leader receives a mortal wound. Wolfe asks an officer to support him so that his followers may not be discouraged by his fall. 
 Friday September 14 - Montcalm dies in the Château St-Louis.
 Monday September 17 - Capitulation of Quebec.
 Tuesday September 18 - The British take possession of Quebec.
 Proclamation issued by Governor of Nova Scotia invites New Englanders to settle there.

Births

Deaths
 September 13 - James Wolfe, British Army officer (born 1727)
 September 14 - Marquis de Montcalm, French Military Commander (Born 1712)

Historical documents
Canada must be preserved to check New England, which has forces to otherwise take all French colonies in America

From London, James Wolfe writes his mother "I shall carry this business thro' with my best abilities," but its outcome is in Providence's hands

"Let the wisdom of the people[...]show itself" - To avoid harm, Wolfe advises Quebec-area residents not to resist his forces

British landing on Île d'Orléans are pleased by polite note left by parish curate and "the beauties and situation of this island"

"The General strictly forbids the inhuman practice of scalping, except when the enemy are Indians, or Canadians dressed like Indians."

Wolfe's long account of his mixed success attacking French positions downriver from Quebec, and his qualms (Note: "savages" used)

"General Wolfe is endeavouring to draw the flower of the French Army[...]to an engagement on his own ground, before he abandons it."

After briefly describing "metropolis of the French dominions in America" before bombardment, eyewitness depicts its destruction

"General discontent prevail'd [among the French, and] now was the time to strike" - Troops are ordered into boats for landing upriver from Quebec

Landed at 4 a.m. on September 13, British troops are impatiently eager to attack and determined not to be captured and scalped

Advancing, holding their fire and then firing "close and heavy discharge" is described by Lt. John Knox at centre of British front line

"He died and conquered" - Wolfe dies contented at French rout after they fire from too far away (sometimes only bruising British)

Capitulation, surrender and occupation of Quebec City, despite brief attack by French artillery outside its walls

Continuing resistance downriver from Quebec City leads to burning of 1,100 houses and hundreds of acres of grain, plus plundering

"Humane and tender" - Hospital run by "reserved and very respectful" nuns treat wounded and ill British soldiers as properly as other patients

Quebec City priest consoles himself about its fall by "rendering spiritual services to the German and Scotch Catholics" among British occupiers

For victory at Quebec, sermon credits Providence for "a Combination of minute Circumstances" and for pointing to "the critical Moment" in battle

Murray warns Canadians to shift favour from Vaudreuil "to a free people, wise, generous, ready to embrace you, to free you from a severe despotism"

"A most grotesque appearance" - Guarding against frostbite makes Quebec garrison "rather resemble a masquerade than a body of regular troops"

Benjamin Franklin's ironic list of reasons Canada should be returned to French, in reply to serious opinion that way

Wendat seem so "satisfied with the change of Masters" that they don't join French resistance to British (Note: "savages" used)

John Knox obtains list of words in local Indigenous language, including "quitchimanitoo" (Note: racial stereotypes)

Sir William Johnson describes defeat of French force attempting to lift his siege of Fort Niagara, and its fall

Robert Rogers writes to "King Uncus, head Sachem of the Mohegan Indians," about recruiting company of 50 men (Note: "savages" used)

Capt. Jacob Nawnawampeteoonk, of "a company of Stockbridge Indians," is among Indigenous fighters and officers on British side

Summary of Gen. Amherst's taking of Ticonderoga (Fort Carillon) and Crown Point, plus comment on significance of these events

Rogers' Rangers destroy Missisquoi village Odanak after British men under flag of truce are captured by "St. Francis Indians"

Guerilla warfare in Nova Scotia includes ambushes followed by torture killings and bodies left on road (Note: gruesome details)

No suit will be allowed in any Nova Scotia court for recovery of land based on title claimed by "former French inhabitants"

No trade to be allowed (temporarily) with various Indigenous peoples, with exception of traders authorized by Nova Scotia government

Halifax may send to workhouse "idle persons," beggars, fortune tellers, runaways etc., while unsupported children are to be apprenticed out

British officer says muskrat's fine fur "is equal in perfume to the genuine musk," but too strong and thus unhealthful to use lining waistcoats

Knox describes seeing crossbills (and capturing one) and belugas (that musket balls bounce off of) in St. Lawrence River

References

 
Canada
59